Do Not Disturb is a 2012 French comedy film directed by Yvan Attal and starring Attal and François Cluzet. It is a remake of the 2009 American film Humpday.

Cast 
 François Cluzet - Jeff
 Yvan Attal - Ben Azuelos
 Laetitia Casta - Anna Azuelos
 Charlotte Gainsbourg - Lilly
 Asia Argento - Monica
 Joeystarr - Mitch
 Leon - Josh

Reception
Sarah Nicole Prickett of The Globe and Mail gave the film 2 1/12 out of 4 stars, writing that the adaptation's "absurdly sexy" nature undercut its comic premise: "In the original, the awkwardness of two straight guys doing it was heightened by America's morality and Shelton's realist style. In this more erotic French version, it feels like: who cares? Just do it."

References

External links 

2012 comedy films
2012 films
Films directed by Yvan Attal
French remakes of American films
French comedy films
2010s French films
2010s French-language films